Pensions in Turkey can be public or private. Article 60 of the 1982 Turkish constitution (similar to Article 48 of the 1961 constitution) states that "Everyone has the right to social security and the State shall take the necessary measures and establish the organization for the provision of social security."

History
Until May 2006, there were three separate social security institutions: SSK, for private and public sector workers; Emekli Sandiği (ES), for civil servants; and Bağ-Kur, for self-employed workers and farmers. In 2006 these were all merged into one institution, the Sosyal Güvenlik Kurumu (Social Security Institution, SGK).

Current system
The state pension system is administered by the Sosyal Güvenlik Kurumu (Social Security Institution, SGK), which collects insurance contributions from employees and their employers, at the rate of 9% from employees and 11% from employers. Once someone who paid contributions to the SGK for the required amount of time reaches retirement age, they become eligible for an SGK pension, with the size of their pension determined by the amount of contributions they paid. In addition to SGK pensions, people can use the private pension system by paying additional contributions into private pension funds administered by insurance companies. The private pension system is regulated by law. 

There is also a separate pension fund, OYAK, for members of the Turkish Armed Forces.

Individual Pension System (BES), is actively promoted by the government. Until 2013, tax refunds were issued up to 30% of the contributions. After 2013, government started to contribute with %25 of paid contributions. These government contributions can be earned under special terms (after some years and age). In 2017, government introduced Automatic BES, which certain employees joined the system automatically with 3% of their salaries. They had the option to leave the system. In September 2020, President Erdoğan announced BES funds can be used for credit purposes.

References 

Turkey
Financial services in Turkey
Social security in Turkey